The third season of the Japanese animated television series A Certain Scientific Railgun, based on the manga of the same name, follows Mikoto Misaka teaming up with Misaki Shokuhō to stop the plans of Academy City's dark side during Daihasei Festival. The season, known as A Certain Scientific Railgun T, was produced by J.C.Staff and directed by Tatsuyuki Nagai from a series composition written by Shogo Yasukawa.

Rina Satō, Satomi Arai, Aki Toyosaki, and Kanae Itō reprise their roles from the previous two seasons of A Certain Scientific Railgun. Azumi Asakura joins them as Shokuhō, whom she also voiced in the first and final episodes of A Certain Scientific Railgun S. Production of the third season was announced in October 2018, with Nagai returning as the director. Yasukawa was confirmed as the series composition writer in September 2019.

A Certain Scientific Railgun T began airing in Japan on January 10, 2020, and consists of twenty-five episodes. Several episodes got delayed due to the COVID-19 pandemic, which caused the season to conclude on September 25, 2020, instead of June as was originally scheduled.


Episode list

Cast and characters

Main

Recurring

Production

Development and writing
During the Dengeki Bunko 25th Anniversary Fall Dengeki Festival event in October 2018, an untitled third season of A Certain Scientific Railgun television series was announced, with Tatsuyuki Nagai confirming his return to direct at J.C.Staff. Kazuma Kamachi, the creator of A Certain Magical Index series, and light novel editor Kazuma Miki revealed in November 2018 that the series was slated to be released in 2019 along with A Certain Scientific Accelerator television series, but it was delayed to January 2020.

In September 2019, staff members from the previous season were confirmed to be returning for the series, including character animation designer Yuichi Tanaka, art director Kentaro Izumi, and cinematographer Shingo Fukuyo, with Shogo Yasukawa handling the series composition. The title of the series was revealed in the same month to be A Certain Scientific Railgun T. The series' premiere date was revealed in November 2019 to be on January 10, 2020, and it would consist of twenty-five episodes. The Daihasei Festival story arc from A Certain Scientific Railgun manga series were adapted into the first half of the series, while the sixteenth episode onwards were based on the Dream Ranker arc.

Casting
With the announcement of a third season in October 2018, Rina Satō, Satomi Arai, Aki Toyosaki, Kanae Itō, and Azumi Asakura were also confirmed to reprise their respective roles as Mikoto Misaka, Kuroko Shirai, Kazari Uiharu, Ruiko Saten, and Misaki Shokuhō. Additional cast were confirmed in December 2019, including Kengo Kawanishi as Gunha Sogīta and Miyu Tomita as Mitori Kōzaku. In February 2020, Konomi Kohara joined the cast as Dolly, as did Atsumi Tanezaki in April as Ryōko Kuriba / Doppelganger.

Music

Maiko Iuchi returned to compose A Certain Scientific Railgun T. From episodes 1 to 15, the opening theme music is "Final Phase" by fripSide, while the ending theme music is "Nameless Story" by Kishida Kyoudan & The Akeboshi Rockets.

Marketing
A full promotional video for A Certain Scientific Railgun T was released in December 2019. The series had the Daihaseisai guidebook and Mikoto Style booklet, which were given for free at the 97th Comiket. EJ Anime Hotel in Tokorozawa used the series as a theme in one of its rooms, which was opened by October 2020. Promotional partners for the series included Atré and Animate stores in Akihabara.

Release

Broadcast
A Certain Scientific Railgun T began airing in Japan on AT-X, Tokyo MX, BS11, and MBS on January 10, 2020.

Home media
A Certain Scientific Railgun T began simulcasting on the Japanese streaming website AbemaTV on January 10, 2020. The series was also streamed on Crunchyroll and Funimation. Hulu released the series in Japan on March 24, 2022.

NBCUniversal Entertainment Japan released the first Blu-ray and DVD volumes of the series on April 30, 2020, and the eighth and final volumes on December 25. They contain a bonus novel written by Kamachi titled A Certain Magical Index SS: Agnese's Magic Side Work Experience, while the first and fifth volumes contain the fifth and sixth episodes of the original video animation . Funimation released the first volume set in North America on March 2, 2021, while the second volume set was released on June 29.

Notes

References

External links
  
 

A Certain Magical Index episode lists
A Certain Magical Index
Certain Scientific Railgun T, A
Certain Scientific Railgun T, A
Certain Scientific Railgun T, A